Kapow may refer to:

 Kapow Records, an American record label
 Kapow!, an American rock band led by Toshi Yano 
 Kapow!, a programming block on Canadian TV channel Teletoon
 Ka-Pow!, an animated web spin-off of Happy Tree Friends

See also 
 Kapo (disambiguation)